The Heart Breaker is a 1925 American short comedy film directed by Philadelphian director, Benjamin Stoloff.

Cast
Judy King  
Jerry Madden as Little boy 
Sid Smith
Dagmar Oakland

External links

1925 films
1925 comedy films
American silent short films
American black-and-white films
Films directed by Benjamin Stoloff
1925 short films
Silent American comedy films
American comedy short films
1920s American films